I due maghi del pallone (The two wizards of the ball) is a 1970 Italian comedy film directed by Mariano Laurenti starring the comic duo Franco and Ciccio.

Plot summary 
Ciccio Ingrassetti is the PR of a milanese pharmaceutical firm which is trying to promote its products through the football team of its sicilian branch. To guarantee success, the owner asks Ciccio to secure the talents of an innovative coach, a "magician" (just like Inter Milan coach Helenio Herrera was dubbed at the time). Ciccio, totally unaware of the subtleties of football (but wary to confess his ignorance of the matter to his boss) misinterprets his orders and hires K.K., an impostor 'clairvoyant' who actually tries to help the team through his 'spells'. Hijinks and mishaps soon ensue.

Cast 

Franco Franchi: K.K.
Ciccio Ingrassia: Ciccio Ingrassetti
Lionello: Tonino
Karin Schubert: Gretel
Elio Crovetto: Baldinotti 
Umberto D'Orsi: Cazzaniga 	
Tiberio Murgia: Concettino Lo Brutto
Enzo Andronico: Major of Pizzusiccu
Paola Tedesco: Daughter of the Major
Luca Sportelli: President of Ghiandineddese  
Dada Gallotti: Adalgisa 
Nino Vingelli: Don Alfio
Ignazio Balsamo: Manager of Ghiandineddese
Renato Cecilia : the Warehouseman

References

External links

I due maghi del pallone at Variety Distribution

1970 films
Italian sports comedy films
1970s sports comedy films
Films directed by Mariano Laurenti
Italian association football films
1970s buddy comedy films
Italian buddy comedy films
1970 comedy films
1970s Italian films